The Western Rhaetian Alps are a mountain range in the central part of the Alps.

Geography 
Administratively the range mainly belongs to the Italian region of Lombardy, the Swiss canton of Graubünden and the Austrian states of Vorarlberg and Tyrol. Also the independent state of Liechtenstein is totally included in the Western Rhaetian Alps.

SOIUSA classification 
According to SOIUSA (International Standardized Mountain Subdivision of the Alps) the mountain range is an Alpine section, classified in the following way:
 main part = Eastern Alps
 major sector = Central Eastern Alps
 section = Western Rhaetian Alps
 code =  II/A-15

Subdivision 
The range is subdivided into seven subsections: 
Oberhalbstein Range  (DE: Oberhalbsteiner Alpen, IT: Alpi del Platta) - SOIUSA code: II/A-15.I,
Albula Alps   (DE: Albula-Alpen, IT: Alpi dell'Albula) - SOIUSA code: II/A-15.II,
Bernina Range  (DE: Berninagruppe, IT: Alpi del Bernina) - SOIUSA code: II/A-15.III,
Livigno Range  (DE: Livigno-Alperne, IT: Alpi di Livigno) - SOIUSA code: II/A-15.IV,
Sesvenna Range  (DE: Sesvennagruppe, IT: Alpi della Val Müstair) - SOIUSA code: II/A-15.V,
Silvretta, Samnaun and Ferwall Alps (DE: Silvretta, Samnaun und Ferwall Alpen, IT: Alpi del Silvretta, del Samnaun e del Verwall) - SOIUSA code: II/A-15.VI,
Plessur Range   (DE: Plessur-Alpen, IT: Alpi del Plessur) - SOIUSA code: II/A-15.VII,
Rätikon   (DE: Rätikon, IT: Catena del Rätikon) - SOIUSA code: II/A-15.- SOIUSA code: II/A-15.VIII.

AVE Classification
The Alpine Club classification of the Eastern Alps categorizes most of the SOIUSA Western Rhaetian Alps groups within the Western Limestone Alps.

Notable summits

Some notable summits of the Western Rhaetian Alps are:

Notable passes

Some notable passes of the Western Rhaetian Alps are:
 Albula Pass
 Bernina Pass
 Flüela Pass
 Foscagno Pass
 Maloja Pass
 Reschen Pass
 Splügen Pass
 Stelvio Pass
 Umbrail Pass
 Wolfgang Pass

References

Bibliography

Maps
 Italian official cartography (Istituto Geografico Militare - IGM); on-line version: www.pcn.minambiente.it
 Swiss official cartography (Swiss Federal Office of Topography - Swisstopo); on-line version:  map.geo.admin.ch

Mountain ranges of the Alps
Mountain ranges of Italy
Mountain ranges of Tyrol (state)
Mountain ranges of Liechtenstein
Mountain ranges of Graubünden
Mountain ranges of Vorarlberg